The Cluniac Priory of Wangford was a small religious house in Wangford in the English county of Suffolk. It was founded before 1159 as a dependency of Thetford Priory. In 1376, it was naturalised before being dissolved in 1540.

Facility and inhabitants
The Priory buildings adjoined the south side of the parish church. It is recorded within the church that the last remaining portions of the Priory were demolished in the late 19th century. At any given time, its complement of monks ranged from three to five men. By 1537 they had been withdrawn and the house leased as a farm.

Priors
The Prior of Wangford was appointed in 1226 by Pope Honorius III to be joint Papal Commissioner along with the Abbot of Westminster and the Archdeacon of Sudbury. Together, these three men resolved important disputes over the tithes due to the church, making the prior an important figure in English Roman Catholicism.

Dissolution
The final dispossession of Wangford and the mother house of Thetford was effected in 1540 with the Dissolution of the Monasteries ordered by Henry VIII of England.

See also
Cluny Abbey
Cluniac Reforms
Order of Saint Benedict

References

Cluniac monasteries in England
Monasteries dissolved under the English Reformation
1540 disestablishments in England
1159 establishments in England
Christian monasteries established in the 12th century
Monasteries in Suffolk
Wangford, East Suffolk